Corpo a Corpo (Body to Body in English) is a 1984 Brazilian telenovela, aired on TV Globo. It was written by Gilberto Braga and Leonor Brassères.

Cast
Antônio Fagundes - Osmar
Gloria Menezes - Teresa
Débora Duarte - Eloá
Hugo Carvana - Alfredo
Joana Fomm - Lúcia
Marcos Paulo - Cláudio
Lauro Corona - Rafa
Malu Mader - Bia

References

External links 
Corpo a Corpo no Memória Globo

1984 telenovelas
1984 Brazilian television series debuts
1985 Brazilian television series endings
Brazilian telenovelas
TV Globo telenovelas
Telenovelas by Gilberto Braga
Portuguese-language telenovelas
Television shows set in Rio de Janeiro (city)
Racism in television